Governor Napier may refer to:

Francis Napier, 10th Lord Napier (1819–1898), Governor of Madras from 1866 to 1872
Robert Napier, 1st Baron Napier of Magdala (1810–1890), Governor of Gibraltar from 1876 to 1883
George Thomas Napier (1784–1855), Governor of the Cape Colony from 1838 to 1844